Zeng Yixin (born October 1962) is a Chinese oncologist and politician, and an academician of the Chinese Academy of Sciences. 

He was a representative of the 19th National Congress of the Chinese Communist Party and a member of the 19th Central Commission for Discipline Inspection.
He is a representative of the 20th National Congress of the Chinese Communist Party and an alternate member of the 20th Central Committee of the Chinese Communist Party.

Biography
Zeng was born in Lianyuan County (now Lianyuan), Hunan, in October 1962, but was raised in Huitong County. Zeng joined the Chinese Communist Party (CCP) in December 1984. In 1985, he graduated from Hengyang Medical College(now University of South China), and went on to receive his doctor's degree in medicine from Zhongshan Medical Sciences University (now Sun Yat-sen University) in 1990. In July 1990, he became an attending doctor at the Guangdong Provincial People's Hospital. He carried out postdoctoral research at Tokyo Institute for the Elderly and the University of Tokyo in July 1992, and became a research assistant at the Hughes Institute of Medicine, University of Pennsylvania in January 1995.

Zeng returned to China in 1997 and that same yearbecame deputy director and director of the Sun Yat-sen University Cancer Center in March, in addition to serving as director of Cancer Research Institute and president of Cancer Hospital.  

In August 2010, he became vice president of Peking Union Medical College, rising to president the next year. In November 2015, he was made president of Beijing Hospital, a post he kept until February 2017. He was appointed deputy director of the National Health Commission in February 2017, concurrently serving as deputy director of the Central Health Committee.

Honours and awards
 2005 Member of the Chinese Academy of Sciences (CAS)

References

1962 births
Living people
People from Lianyuan
Scientists from Hunan
University of South China alumni
Sun Yat-sen University alumni
University of Tokyo alumni
Members of the Chinese Academy of Sciences
People's Republic of China politicians from Hunan
Chinese Communist Party politicians from Hunan
Alternate members of the 20th Central Committee of the Chinese Communist Party